Churn Creek is a tributary of the Fraser River in the Canadian province of British Columbia.

Course
Churn Creek flows generally north before turning northeast on its final leg through grasslands, joining the Fraser River just south of the headquarters of the Gang Ranch and opposite the community of Dog Creek and associated creek.  Most of its lower course is a heavily-eroded canyon lined by benchlands, and is protected in Churn Creek Protected Area, which also includes the ecological preserve of the Empire Valley Ranch.

From there it proceeds northwest, falling steeply from the high plateau between those two ranges, joining at the bottom of that grade with an unnamed creek from Swartz (Fish) Lake, one a chain of lakes in the area of the Mud Lakes Pass, at the divide with the basin of Tyaughton Creek, also a tributary of the Bridge River. From there it turns north in its main trajectory, forming the northwestern flank of the northern Camelsfoot Range. It is joined in its upper reaches by its two main left tributaries, Lone Valley Creek and Dash Creek, which drain the southernmost Chilcotin Plateau just north of the edge of the Chilcotin Ranges and the Spruce Lake Protected Area (now known as the South Chilcotin Mountain Park, created in 2010, which consists of a smaller area than the original Protected Area).

See also
Dash Creek
Lone Valley Creek
Big Creek Provincial Park
Hungry Valley Creek
List of British Columbia rivers

References

Tributaries of the Fraser River
Rivers of British Columbia
Lillooet Land District